Střížovice is a municipality and village in Jindřichův Hradec District in the South Bohemian Region of the Czech Republic. It has about 600 inhabitants.

Administrative parts
Villages of Budkov and Vlčice are administrative parts of Střížovice.

References

Villages in Jindřichův Hradec District